This is a list of the awards and nominations received by American country music duo Sugarland.

Academy of Country Music Awards
The Academy of Country Music Awards is an annual country music awards show, the first ever created, established in 1964. Sugarland has won  awards, out of  nominations. They have won five ACM Awards out of seventeen nominations.

American Country Awards
The American Country Awards is a country music awards show, entirely voted on by fans. Created by the Fox Network, the awards honor country music artists in music, video, and touring categories. Sugarland has been nominated for this award four times.

American Music Awards
The American Music Awards is an annual awards ceremony created by Dick Clark in 1973. Sugarland has won one AMA out of three nominations.

Billboard Music Awards
The Billboard Music Award is an honor given by Billboard, the preeminent publication covering the music business. Finalists are based on United States year-end chart performance according to Nielsen data for sales, number of downloads and total airplay. They have been nominated three times for this award.

Country Music Association Awards
The Country Music Association Awards is an annual country music awards show, established in 1967. They have won six CMA's out of seventeen nominations.

CMT Music Awards
The CMT Music Awards is an annual fan-voted video music awards show that was established in 2002 by CMT, dedicated exclusively to honor country music videos.

Grammy Awards
The Grammy Awards are presented annually by the National Academy of Recording Arts and Sciences for outstanding achievements in the music industry. It was established in 1959. Sugarland has won two Grammys out of five nominations.

Other nominations

2005: Radio Music Awards - Song of the Year/Country Radio "Baby Girl"
2010: Teen Choice Awards - Choice Music: Country Group

References

Sugarland